The 1st ISSF Rifle/Pistol World Shooting Championships were held in New Administrative Capital, Egypt from 12 to 27 October 2022 in 78 events. This also served as qualification event for 2024 Summer Olympics.

Medals

Senior

Medal summary

Senior

Men

Women

Mixed

Junior

Men

Women

Mixed

Total (Senior and Junior)

Olympic quotas

See also
 2022 World Running Target Championships
 2022 World Shotgun Championships

References

External links
 ISSF website
 Entry List by Event
 General Information
 Schedule

2018
2022 in shooting sports
International sports competitions hosted by Egypt
2022 in Egyptian sport
Shooting competitions in Egypt
Sports competitions in Cairo
October 2022 sports events in Africa